Goi Dam is a rockfill dam located in Toyama prefecture in Japan. The dam is used for irrigation. The catchment area of the dam is 13.8 km2. The dam impounds about 57  ha of land when full and can store 8800 thousand cubic meters of water. The construction of the dam was started on 1974 and completed in 1992.

References

Dams in Toyama Prefecture
1992 establishments in Japan